Donna Ong (born 30 July 1978) is a Singaporean artist. She is known for her installation works, which often feature environments created with assemblages, found objects, and sculpture. Her practice draws upon notions of botany, landscaping, and representations of nature in both European and Chinese art.

She has exhibited locally and internationally, from the inaugural Singapore Biennale in 2006, the 11th Venice Biennale International Architectural Exhibition in 2008, to the 9th Asia Pacific Triennial of Contemporary Art (APT9) in Brisbane, Queensland, Australia in 2018.

Education and personal life
Donna Ong was born in 1978, daughter of the Singaporean sculptor Michael Ong. Ong attended the Malvern Girls College in Worcestershire, England, now known as Malvern St James. In 1996, Ong began studying the Bartlett Centre in University College London, graduating in 1999 with a Bachelor of Science in Architecture. In 1999, Ong was awarded the bond-free Shell-NAC Arts Scholarship of Singapore to attend Goldsmiths College at the University of London. She graduated in 2003 with a Bachelor of Fine Arts, after which she returned to Singapore. In 2011, she would pursue her Master of Fine Arts at the LASALLE College of the Arts, completing her studies in 2012.

Career
Ong's work has been shown at both local and international exhibitions, institutions, and festivals. She has exhibited at institutions such as the Singapore Art Museum, NUS Museum, and the National Gallery Singapore, as well as at the inaugural Singapore Biennale in 2006. Internationally, she has participated in the 2nd Moscow Biennale in 2007, represented at the Singapore Pavilion during the 11th Venice Biennale International Architectural Exhibition in 2008, the Kwandu Biennale in 2008, the Jakarta Biennale in 2009, the Moscow Biennale of Young Art in 2014, and the 9th Asia Pacific Triennial of Contemporary Art (APT9) in Brisbane, Queensland, Australia in 2018.

Some past works include:
Secret Interiors: Chrysalis (2006) which explore the secret hidden desires of four fictitious personae, first exhibited at the Singapore Biennale in 2006 and later at the Moscow Biennale in 2007.
Palace of Dreams (2004), a work involving intricate drawings of insects and a mahogany desk transformed into a plane, referencing fairy tales and childhood dreams.
Doctor Auctor (2003), a photographic work of 24 pictures in film noir style. This was the winner of the Sefton Open Competition in 2D Art.
Sing O Barren Woman (2002) a mixed media installation art piece.
Alpha Omega (1998) a sculpture of a dying woman giving birth.

Awards
 Prudential Eye Awards, Greater Asia. Best Emerging Artist Using Installation (2015)
 NAC Young Artist Award, Singapore. (2009).
 Sefton Open Competition in 2D Art, U.K. (2003). Holding the distinction of being the first photographic art piece ever to win the prize.
 Shell-NAC Scholarship, Singapore. (1999).
 Michelle Knight Art Prize, Malvern Girls' College, UK. (1998).

References

External links
 Prudential Eye Awards
 2nd Moscow Biennale
 Channel NewsAsia
 Official Site

1978 births
Living people
Singaporean installation artists
Alumni of Goldsmiths, University of London
Alumni of University College London
People educated at Malvern St James
Singaporean artists